Fumi Kaneko (金子 扶生, Kaneko Fumi, born ) is a Japanese ballet dancer. She joined the Royal Ballet in London in 2011, and was named a principal dancer in 2021.

Early life
Kaneko was raised in Osaka. She started ballet at age three, and at 8, she started attending Jinushi Kaoru Ballet School until 11 pm. Her training was mainly in the Russian style. 

Due to the lack of performance opportunities for young dancers in Japan, she competed in various international competitions, winning first class distinction at Varna International Ballet Competition in 2008, and a silver medal at Moscow International Ballet Competition in 2009.

Career
Kaneko joined the Jinushi Kaoru Ballet Company in 2010. After she won a silver medal at USA International Ballet Competition in 2010, she joined The Royal Ballet in London in April 2011, even though at the time she did not speak English. She was named first artist in 2012, soloist in 2013 and first soloist in 2018. Lead roles she danced include Kitri in Don Quixote, Sugar Plum Fairy in The Nutcracker and Aurora in The Sleeping Beauty, as well as in MacMillan's Concerto and Balanchine's Symphony in C. 

In January 2020, Kaneko was supposed to dance in the cinema relay of The Sleeping Beauty as the Lilac Fairy, but danced the lead role Aurora in order to replace an injured Lauren Cuthbertson. Later that year, her debut as Odette/Odile in Swan Lake was delayed due to the COVID-19 pandemic. 

In May 2021, she was promoted to principal dancer. Her first performance since her promotion was in Wheeldon's Within the Golden Hour. Since her promotion, she had made her debut as Juliet in MacMillan's Romeo and Juliet, and as Odette/Odile in Swan Lake. She also originated the role of Satan in McGregor's The Dante Project, and in Abraham's The Weathering. In March 2022, Kaneko appeared in a gala benefitting the Disasters Emergency Committee (DEC) Ukraine Humanitarian Appeal at the London Coliseum, performing the white swan pas de deux from Swan Lake with William Bracewell.

Personal life
As of 2019, Kaneko lives in Chiswick, West London.

References

External links
Fumi Kaneko on the Royal Opera House's website

1991 births
Living people
People from Osaka
Japanese ballerinas
Principal dancers of The Royal Ballet
Prima ballerinas
Japanese expatriates in England
21st-century ballet dancers